Municipal Building may refer to the following places:

United States

Arkansas
Crossett Municipal Building, Crossett, AR, listed on the NRHP in Arkansas
Municipal Building (El Dorado, Arkansas), El Dorado, AR, listed on the National Register of Historic Places (NRHP) in Arkansas
Texarkana, Arkansas, Municipal Building, Texarkana, AR, listed on the NRHP in Arkansas

California
Valley Municipal Building, Van Nuys, CA

Colorado
Cañon City Municipal Building, Cañon City, CO, listed on the NRHP in Colorado

Connecticut
Municipal Building (Hartford, Connecticut), listed on the NRHP in Connecticut

Florida
Holly Hill Municipal Building, Holly Hill, FL, listed on the NRHP in Florida

Georgia
Cochran Municipal Building and School, Cochran, GA, listed on the NRHP in Georgia

Illinois
Berwyn Municipal Building, Berwyn, IL, listed on the NRHP in Illinois
St. Charles Municipal Building, St. Charles, IL, listed on the NRHP in Illinois

Iowa
Municipal Building (Ames, Iowa), listed on the NRHP in Iowa
Municipal Building (Des Moines, Iowa), listed on the NRHP in Iowa

Kentucky
Junction City Municipal Building, Junction City, KY, listed on the NRHP in Kentucky

Louisiana
Bossier City Municipal Building, Bossier City, LA, listed on the NRHP in Louisiana
Shreveport Municipal Building, Shreveport, LA, listed on the NRHP in Louisiana

Maine
Municipal Building (Rumford, Maine), listed on the NRHP in Maine

Massachusetts
Fields Corner Municipal Building, Boston, MA, listed on the NRHP in Massachusetts
Norwood Memorial Municipal Building, Norwood, MA, listed on the NRHP in Massachusetts
Reading Municipal Building, Reading, MA, listed on the NRHP in Massachusetts
Westfield Municipal Building, Westfield, MA, listed on the NRHP in Massachusetts

Michigan
Ishpeming Municipal Building, Ishpeming, MI, listed on the NRHP in Michigan

Minnesota
Kasson Municipal Building, Kasson, MN, listed on the NRHP in Minnesota

Mississippi
Municipal Building (Meridian, Mississippi), listed on the NRHP in Mississippi

New Mexico
Las Vegas Municipal Building, Las Vegas, NM, listed on the NRHP in New Mexico

New York (state)
Lancaster Municipal Building (Lancaster, New York), listed on the NRHP in New York
Bronx Municipal Building, in New York City
Brooklyn Municipal Building, in New York City
Manhattan Municipal Building, also known as Municipal Building, in New York City, listed on the NRHP in New York City
Municipal Building (New York, New York), listed on the NRHP in New York City
Municipal Building (Oneonta, New York), listed on the NRHP in New York
Newark Valley Municipal Building and Tappan-Spaulding Memorial Library, Newark Valley, NY, listed on the NRHP in New York

North Carolina
Henderson Fire Station and Municipal Building, Henderson, NC, listed on the NRHP in North Carolina
Hickory Municipal Building, Hickory, NC, listed on the NRHP in North Carolina
Morehead City Municipal Building, Morehead City, NC, listed on the NRHP in North Carolina
New Bern Municipal Building, New Bern, NC, listed on the NRHP in North Carolina

Oklahoma
Municipal Building (Springfield, Ohio), listed on the NRHP in Ohio
Norwood Municipal Building, Norwood, OH, listed on the NRHP in Ohio

Mississippi
Oklahoma City Municipal Building, Oklahoma City, OK, listed on the NRHP in Oklahoma
Tulsa Municipal Building, Tulsa, OK, listed on the NRHP in Oklahoma

Pennsylvania
Indiana Borough 1912 Municipal Building, Indiana, PA, listed on the NRHP in Pennsylvania
Municipal Building and Central Fire Station, 340, Scranton, PA, listed on the NRHP in Pennsylvania

South Dakota
Municipal Building-City Hall, Faith, SD, listed on the NRHP in South Dakota

Tennessee
Municipal Building (Chattanooga, Tennessee), listed on the NRHP in Tennessee

Texas
Bryan Municipal Building, Bryan, TX, listed on the NRHP in Texas

Utah
Ogden/Weber Municipal Building, Ogden, UT, listed on the NRHP in Utah
Price Municipal Building, Price, UT, listed on the NRHP in Utah
Salina Municipal Building and Library, Salina, UT, listed on the NRHP in Utah

Virginia
Danville Municipal Building, Danville, VA, listed on the NRHP in Virginia
Hopewell Municipal Building, Hopewell, VA, listed on the NRHP in Virginia

West Virginia
Municipal Building (Bluefield, West Virginia), listed on the NRHP in West Virginia

Wisconsin
Colfax Municipal Building, Colfax, WI, listed on the NRHP in Wisconsin
Lancaster Municipal Building (Lancaster, Wisconsin), listed on the NRHP in Wisconsin

Elsewhere
181-187 Hay Street, Sydney, Australia, an historic building also known as the Municipal Building
Municipal Building, Singapore

See also

Seat of government
Municipal Palace (disambiguation)